My Man is a 1924 American silent drama film directed by David Smith and starring Patsy Ruth Miller, Dustin Farnum, and Niles Welch.

Plot
As described in a review of the film in a film magazine, Sledge (Farnum), the political boss of a small city, combines with a promoter to establish a new street car line. In the meantime he sees and falls in love with Molly (Miller), the daughter of the president of the existing street car line, but is opposed by Bert Glider (Webb), a lounge lizard. Sledge starts his wooing of Molly and impresses her with his force and lavishness of his presents, but she thinks he is uncouth, resents his attempts to dominate her and prepares to marry Glider. Sledge kidnaps her but relents and sends her back home. She learns that Glider is a scoundrel and finally agrees to marry Sledge.

Cast

Preservation
With no prints of My Man located in any film archives, it is a lost film.

References

Bibliography
 Munden, Kenneth White. The American Film Institute Catalog of Motion Pictures Produced in the United States, Part 1. University of California Press, 1997.

External links

1924 films
1924 drama films
Silent American drama films
Films directed by David Smith (director)
American silent feature films
1920s English-language films
American black-and-white films
Vitagraph Studios films
1920s American films